The First Abang Johari cabinet took office on 19 January 2017, six days after the election of Abang Abdul Rahman Zohari Abang Openg to the leadership of Parti Pesaka Bumiputera Bersatu (PBB) and his appointment as Chief Minister of Sarawak, Malaysia. It succeeded the second Adenan cabinet, which dissolved on 11 January 2017 following the death of the previous Chief Minister Adenan Satem.

The cabinet consists of ministers and assistant ministers from PBB, the Sarawak United Peoples' Party (SUPP), Parti Rakyat Sarawak (PRS) and Progressive Democratic Party (PDP) and it remained in office during the departure of the four governing parties from the Barisan Nasional coalition and the formation of the Gabungan Parti Sarawak coalition on 12 June 2018.

The cabinet was dissolved on 4 January 2022, just after the Second Abang Johari cabinet was sworn into office with effect.

Composition

Ministers

Assistant ministers

Ex-officio members

References 

Politics of Sarawak
Cabinets established in 2017